Bethany is a city in Oklahoma County, Oklahoma, United States, and a part of the Oklahoma City metropolitan area. The community was founded in 1909 by followers of the Church of the Nazarene from Oklahoma City.

History
Bethany was founded July 28, 1909 as a community where members of the Church of the Nazarene, an evangelical Christian movement that developed from Holiness churches, could practice their religious beliefs without interference by non-members. The town was named after the biblical place of Bethany. The community quickly founded Oklahoma Holiness College (now known as Southern Nazarene University, SNU). Two other institutions were soon established, the Oklahoma Orphanage (now the Children's Center, a medical facility) operated by Mattie Mallory, and the Nazarene Rescue Home for unwed mothers.

Bethany incorporated on August 8, 1910 as a rural town; its economy depended on the surrounding farmlands. It gained a post office on March 11, 1913. With a relatively large population of conservative Nazarenes, the town council soon enacted strict blue laws that banned alcohol, tobacco, gambling, dancing, movies, swearing, and working on Sundays. After Bethany reorganized as a first class city in 1931, it relaxed these laws to some extent. 

An F4 tornado struck Bethany on November 19, 1930, killing 23 people and destroying 652 buildings. It is one of three documented violent November tornadoes in Oklahoma since 1900. Recovery from the storm was slow until the outbreak of World War II. Defense industries rapidly developed in the area, and the city added population as bedroom community, or suburb for workers commuting to Oklahoma City.

Geography
Bethany is located at  (35.504607, -97.638818).

Demographics

According to the 2020 census, the racial composition of Bethany was as follows:
 White or European American: 56.0%
 Hispanic or Latino: 23.8%
 Black or African American: 8.2%
 Asian: 1.3%
 Native American: 2.6%
 Native Hawaiian and Other Pacific Islander: 0.01%
 Other race: 0.01%
 Two or more races (non-Hispanic): 7.6%

As of the census of 2000, there were 20,307 people, 8,161 households, and 5,280 families residing in the city. The population density was 3,896.7 people per square mile (1,504.9/km2). There were 8,874 housing units at an average density of 1,702.8 per square mile (657.6/km2). The racial makeup of the city was 85.79% White, 4.36% African American, 2.87% Native American, 1.38% Asian, 0.05% Pacific Islander, 2.18% from other races, and 3.36% from two or more races. Hispanic or Latino of any race were 5.80% of the population.

There were 8,161 households, out of which 28.1% had children under the age of 18 living with them, 49.0% were married couples living together, 12.1% had a female householder with no husband present, and 35.3% were non-families. 31.0% of all households were made up of individuals, and 12.2% had someone living alone who was 65 years of age or older. The average household size was 2.33 and the average family size was 2.91.

In the city, the population was spread out, with 23.0% under the age of 18, 12.9% from 18 to 24, 25.8% from 25 to 44, 21.5% from 45 to 64, and 16.7% who were 65 years of age or older. The median age was 36 years. For every 100 females, there were 89.7 males. For every 100 females age 18 and over, there were 84.4 males.

The median income for a household in the city was $35,073, and the median income for a family was $43,905. Males had a median income of $30,180 versus $24,747 for females. The per capita income for the city was $17,793. About 6.9% of families and 9.0% of the population were below the poverty line, including 12.7% of those under age 18 and 3.9% of those age 65 or over.

Governance

City government
The city operates using a council-manager government system. The city council comprises two members elected from each of the four wards. The city manager, city attorney, and municipal judge are appointed by the council. The mayor is elected at large. The current Mayor is Nikki Lloyd.

State government
Most of Bethany is represented in the Oklahoma Senate by Julia Kirt, with some areas falling into the districts of Carrie Hicks and Greg Treat. It is represented in the Oklahoma House of Representatives by Tammy West and Marilyn Stark.

Economy
The largest employers in the area include: Southern Nazarene University, Southwestern Christian University, The Children's Center, Bethany and Putnam City Public Schools, City of Bethany, and Gilbert Medical Clinic. Bethany became the headquarters for the International Pentecostal Holiness Church in 1975. It is also the headquarters for the Pinto Horse Association of America.

Transportation
Wiley Post Airport handles business and commercial aircraft. It also has an industrial park that contains about fifty aviation-related businesses, including Rockwell International (an aircraft manufacturer), Million Air, Servicenter Incorporated, and the Federal Aviation Administration Systems Management Office.

The main vehicular route in and out of Bethany is the 39th Street Expressway (part of Historic Route 66), which runs through downtown Bethany.

Education

Public schools
Both Bethany School District and the Putnam City School District provide educational needs to citizens within its district borders. The chief educational providers for elementary-aged students include the Southern Nazarene University School for Children on the campus of Calvary Church of the Nazarene, about 1 mile south of Southern Nazarene University, as well as Bethany Earl Harris Elementary. Primary school goes from pre-K - 5th grade. Bethany Middle School and Western Oaks Junior High School respond to those in 6th - 8th grade. Bethany High School, home of the Bronchos, covers grades 9th - 12th. Putnam City schools located within Bethany include: Apollo Elementary, Lake Park Elementary, Overholser Elementary, Western Oaks Elementary, and Western Oaks Middle School.

The superintendent for Bethany Public Schools is Drew Eichelberger.
The website for Bethany Public Schools is http://bethanyschools.com/.

The superintendent for Putnam City Schools is Dr. Fred Rhodes.
The website for Putnam City Schools is http://putnamcityschools.org/.

Higher education
Bethany is home to two universities: Southern Nazarene University (SNU) and Southwestern Christian University (SWCU).

SNU offers adult degree completion and many masters programs including an MBA with evening classes. Southwestern Christian University is a Holiness–Pentecostal university specializing in Bible and Christian ministries and offers adult degree completion and master programs.

Attractions
The Bethany parks and recreation system includes many small neighborhood parks, and four large parks, Eldon Lyon Park, McFarland Park, Ripper Park, and Stinchcomb Wildlife Refuge. Eldon Lyon Park is the venue for the annual Fourth of July festival, which is an all-day event with fireworks, a carnival, and a parade that starts on main street. Downtown festivals include Bethany66, the Annual Tree Lighting, Cinco de Mayo and is home to many special one-time musical events hosted by main street businesses like Java39.

Notable people
Shannon Lucid (b. 1943), American biochemist and astronaut, raised in Bethany and graduated from Bethany High School.
Allie Reynolds (1917 - 1994), American professional baseball pitcher was born in Bethany.
Chris Chamberlain (b. 1985), Professional Football Player (NFL) was born in Bethany.

References

External links
 City of Bethany Official Website

Oklahoma City metropolitan area
Cities in Oklahoma
Cities in Oklahoma County, Oklahoma
Populated places established in 1909
1909 establishments in Oklahoma